The Canton of Goyave is a former canton in the Arrondissement of Basse-Terre on the island of Guadeloupe. It had 11,234 inhabitants (2012). It was disbanded following the French canton reorganisation which came into effect in March 2015. It consisted of two communes, which joined the canton of Petit-Bourg in 2015.

Municipalities
The canton included two communes:
Goyave
Petit-Bourg (partly)

See also
Cantons of Guadeloupe
Communes of Guadeloupe
Arrondissements of Guadeloupe

References

Former cantons of Guadeloupe
2015 disestablishments in France
States and territories disestablished in 2015